Norman Foster (born Boston, Massachusetts)<ref>Reed, Peter Hugh (ed.), "Mahler: Kindertotenlieder" (review), American Record Guide, Volumes 22-23, Helen Dwight Reid Educational Foundation, 1956. p. 75</ref> was an American operatic bass-baritone, a film and television actor and a  television producer.

Recordings
Gustav Mahler: Lieder eines fahrenden Gesellen with Bamberg Symphony Orchestra conducted by Jascha Horenstein recorded 1954 (Vox Box, 47163552922, released 1999)
Samuel Barber: Vanessa (Norman Foster,  Eleanor Steber,  Nicolai Gedda,  Alois Pernerstorfer,  Rosalind Elias,  Ira Malaniuk,  Giorgio Tozzi) Vienna State Opera Chorus, Vienna Philharmonic Orchestra; Conductor: Dimitri Mitropoulos. Orfeo ORF 653062.
Gian Carlo Menotti: The Medium Performer:  Norman Foster (Baritone), Hilde Konetzni (Soprano), Sonja Draksler (Mezzo Soprano), María José De Vine (Soprano), Elisabeth Höngen (Mezzo Soprano), Nino Albanese (Voice); Vienna Volksoper Orchestra, Armando Aliberti (conductor). Recorded 1964. Label: Arthaus Musik (DVD) 101515, released 2010

Films
 Herzog Blaubarts Burg (Bluebeard's Castle) (1964)
 Espionage: A Free Agent (1964)
 Die lustigen Weiber von Windsor (The Merry Wives of Windsor'') (1966)

Notes and references

External links
 
 Biography at Bach-cantatas.com
 Merry Wives of Windsor review in the New York Times

1924 births
2000 deaths
Operatic basses
20th-century American male opera singers